Sandy Creek is a stream in northwest Cape Girardeau County in the U.S. state of Missouri. It is a tributary of Little Apple Creek which flows into Apple Creek approximately one mile to the northeast.

The stream headwaters arise just north of Friedheim (at ) and it flows southeast and east passing under Missouri Route KK twice then passing north of Arnsberg to its confluence with Little Apple Creek one-half mile west of I-55 (at ).

Sandy Creek was so named due to the abundant sand along its course.

See also
List of rivers of Missouri

References

Rivers of Cape Girardeau County, Missouri
Rivers of Missouri